The Thursday Night Sport Show was an Australian sports television series that aired on One every Thursday at 9.30pm from 2 October 2014 and 13 November 2014. The show hosted by Mel McLaughlin with regular panellists Mark Howard and Sam Mac.

See also

10 Bold original programming
10 Sport
Australian sports television series
2014 Australian television series debuts
2014 Australian television series endings